Niner or Niners may refer to:

 Niner, the pronunciation of the number nine in the NATO phonetic alphabet
 29er (disambiguation)
 49er (disambiguation)
 Niner, a bicycle company that exclusively produces 29 inch wheel bikes
 Niners, nickname for BV Chemnitz 99, a German basketball club
 Niners (Star Trek), fictional baseball team in Star Trek: Deep Space Nine episode "Take Me Out to the Holosuite"
 Niners, a name for fans of Star Trek: Deep Space Nine derived from the baseball team
 Sendai 89ers, a Japanese basketball team